Palisades Tartan is a British/American film distribution company, founded by US-based Palisades Media Group to take over the film library of film distributor Tartan Films after it folded in the summer of 2008.

History
Tartan Films, established in 1984, was a UK-based film distributor. Founder Hamish McAlpine (not to be confused with the Hamish McAlpine that played football for Dundee United) is credited with creating the term "Asia Extreme" and making such films accessible to the masses. It also owned the US-based Tartan USA and Tartan Video. It has distributed East Asian films under the brand Tartan Asia Extreme.  Between 1992-2003 Tartan Films operated under the name Metro-Tartan Distribution before reverting to Tartan Films. More recently, it has released similar films of other origins, under its Tartan Terror brand. Such films include Battle Royale, the Whispering Corridors series A Tale of Two Sisters, The Last Horror Movie and Oldboy.

Tartan Films USA released various internationally acclaimed films for the US market, including Oldboy, Triad Election, The Page Turner, 12:08 East of Bucharest, Red Road, 9 Songs, The Death of Mr. Lazarescu, The Cave of the Yellow Dog, and Battle in Heaven. Tartan USA's DVD catalogue was released through Genius Products, which was 70% owned by The Weinstein Company.

In June 2008, Tartan went into administration, laid off its employees, and ceased operations. The US branch was shuttered a month earlier and its library of films was sold to the Palisades Media Group. Shortly after the sale, a representative of the Bryanston Distributing Company made a seven-figure cash offer to buy the company’s film library, but the offer was rejected by Palisades Media.

Releases

Palisades Tartan
On September 28, 2008, the newly named Palisades Tartan label released its first UK DVD title (cat. no. PAL001DVD), the film P2, directed by Franck Khalfoun. On January 7, 2009, Palisades Tartan released Silent Light in the United States theatrically; it was the first US theatrical release for the company.

Tartan Films
Prior to the take-over, Tartan had originally released all of its films, including its Asia Extreme and Tartan Terror labels on VHS. As DVD became more popular, the company chose to release solely on this format and deleted the VHS back catalogue. The Metro Tartan branch of the company dealt with theatrical distribution.

References

External links
Palisades Tartan home page
United Kingdom Tartan Video home page
United Kingdom Tartan Films home page
United States home page
Palisades Tartan Specials

Film distributors of the United Kingdom